Albert Freeman (21 October 1899 – ?) was an English professional association footballer who played as an inside forward.

References

Footballers from Preston, Lancashire
English footballers
Association football forwards
Burnley F.C. players
Swansea City A.F.C. players
English Football League players
1899 births
Year of death missing